Ash Kalra (born January 21, 1972) is an American politician serving in the California State Assembly. He is a Democrat representing the 27th Assembly District, encompassing parts of eastern San Jose. Kalra is the first Indian-American to serve in the California State Legislature.

Professional background

Kalra, an attorney, served in the Santa Clara County public defender's office for 11 years.

Political background
Prior to being elected to the Assembly, Kalra was a member of the San Jose City Council where he represented District 2 in South San Jose for eight years.

Kalra was first elected to the Assembly after defeating in the general election, fellow city council member and Democrat, Madison Nguyen, and therefore succeeding term-limited Democrat Nora Campos. Kalra supported Bernie Sanders's 2020 presidential campaign.

Kalra has been mentioned as a possible replacement for Xavier Becerra as Attorney General of California following his appointment as Secretary of Health and Human Services.

Bills
In the 2019–2020 legislative session, Kalra has authored AB-2542 (California Racial Justice Act of 2020), AB 1586 (Replacing Animals in Science Education Act), AB 572 (California Deforestation-Free Procurement), and AB 454 (Migratory birds: Migratory Bird Treaty Act).

Personal life
Kalra was born in Toronto and later moved to California. He is a vegan. His education was at UC Santa Barbara. In a 2011, Kalra was arrested for and pleaded no contest to driving under the influence of alcohol. He was sentenced to serve community service hours and receive counseling. He attended Georgetown Law from 1993 - 1996.

2016 California State Assembly

2018 California State Assembly

2020 California State Assembly

References

External links 
 
 Campaign website

1972 births
21st-century American politicians
American politicians of Indian descent
California politicians of Indian descent
Driving under the influence
Living people
Democratic Party members of the California State Assembly
Politicians from San Jose, California
Politicians from Toronto
Public defenders